Thomas Edward Ishee (born 1965) is a United States Navy vice admiral who serves as the commander of the United States Sixth Fleet and Naval Striking and Support Forces NATO. He previously served as the director of operations of the United States Strategic Command from August 3, 2020 to July 2022.

Military career
In May 2022, Ishee was nominated for promotion to vice admiral and assignment as commander of the United States Sixth Fleet.

References

External links

|-

1965 births
Living people
Place of birth missing (living people)
University of Georgia alumni
Cockrell School of Engineering alumni
United States submarine commanders
Air War College alumni
United States Navy admirals